An incomplete list of films produced in Brazil in the 1970s. For an alphabetical list of films currently on Wikipedia see :Category:Brazilian films

1970

1971

1972

1973

1974

1975

1976

1977

1978

1979

External links
 Brazilian film at the Internet Movie Database

1970s
Lists of 1970s films
Films